"Why I Love You So Much" is a song by American R&B singer Monica, composed by Daryl Simmons for Monica's debut studio album, Miss Thang (1995). The ballad was released as the album's fourth and final single on a double A-side with "Ain't Nobody" during the second quarter of 1996. The double-A-side single became Monica's third consecutive top ten hit on the US Billboard Hot 100 with a peak position of number 9.

Music video
The video was shot in San Francisco at the Italian shop Bohemian Cigar Store and Cafe. The video start with other people walking in different places. Monica sings in front of her man saying that he is her whole world and she's been his girl forever: the video was directed by Kevin Bray.

The music video premiered on video stations such as BET and The Box on the week ending April 14, 1996.

Track listing

Notes
 denotes additional producer
Sample credits
"Ain't Nobody contains portions from "Poverty's Paradise" as written by Dale Warren and performed by 24-Carat Black.

Charts

Weekly charts

Year-end charts

Certifications

References

External links
 Monica.com — official Monica site
 Monica music videos — watch "Why I Love You So Much" at LAUNCHcast

1995 songs
1996 singles
Monica (singer) songs
Arista Records singles
Songs written by Daryl Simmons
Song recordings produced by Daryl Simmons
Music videos directed by Kevin Bray (director)
Pop ballads
Soul ballads
Contemporary R&B ballads
1990s ballads